Most symphonies by classical composers after the baroque era are indicated by a number.

0–40

Symphony No. 0
Symphony No. 1
 Symphony No. 1 in C major
 Symphony No. 1 in C minor
 Symphony No. 1 in D major
 Symphony No. 1 in D minor
Symphony No. 2
 Symphony No. 2 in D major
Symphony No. 3
 Symphony No. 3 in E-flat major
Symphony No. 4
 Symphony No. 4 in E-flat major
Symphony No. 5
 Symphony No. 5 in B-flat
 Symphony No. 5 in D major
Symphony No. 6
 Symphony No. 6 in B minor
 Symphony No. 6 in F major
Symphony No. 7
Symphony No. 8
Symphony No. 9
 Symphony No. 9 in D minor
 Symphony No. 9 in E minor
Symphony No. 10
Symphony No. 11 
Symphony No. 12
Symphony No. 13
Symphony No. 14
Symphony No. 15
Symphony No. 16
Symphony No. 17
Symphony No. 18
Symphony No. 19
Symphony No. 20
Symphony No. 21
Symphony No. 22
Symphony No. 23
Symphony No. 24
Symphony No. 25
Symphony No. 26
Symphony No. 27
Symphony No. 28
Symphony No. 29
Symphony No. 30
Symphony No. 31
Symphony No. 32
Symphony No. 33
Symphony No. 34
Symphony No. 35
Symphony No. 36
Symphony No. 37
Symphony No. 38
Symphony No. 39
Symphony No. 40

41–66
Symphony No. 41
Symphony No. 48
Symphony No. 50
Symphony No. 60
Symphony No. 63
Symphony No. 66

Specific composers
 List of symphonies by Joseph Haydn
 List of symphonies by Wolfgang Amadeus Mozart
 List of symphonies by Leif Segerstam

 
List, number